The Sloot Digital Coding System was a data sharing technique that its inventor claimed could store a complete digital movie file in 8 kilobytes of data — violating Shannon's source coding theorem by many orders of magnitude. The alleged technique was developed in 1995 by Romke Jan Bernhard Sloot (27 August 1945, Groningen – 11 July 1999, Nieuwegein), a Dutch electronics engineer. In 1999, just days before the conclusion of a contract to sell his invention, Sloot died suddenly of a heart attack. The source code was never recovered, and the technique and claim have never been reproduced or verified.

Background 
Sloot was born the youngest of three children. His father, a school headmaster, left his family quite soon after Sloot's birth. Sloot was enrolled at a Dutch technical school, but dropped out early to work at a radio station. After fulfilling mandatory military service, Sloot settled in Utrecht with his wife. He worked briefly for Philips Electronics in Eindhoven. He left this job in 1978 after a year and a half, starting his next job in Groningen at an audio and video store. A few years later he moved to Nieuwegein where he started his own company repairing televisions and stereos.

In 1984, Sloot began focusing on computer technology such as the Philips P2000, Commodore 64, IBM PC XT, and AT. Sloot developed the idea of a countrywide repair service network called RepaBase with a database containing details on all repairs carried out. This concept was the motivation to develop alternative data storage techniques that would require significantly less space than traditional methods.

Sloot Encoding System 
In 1995, Sloot claimed to have developed a data encoding technique that could store an entire feature film in only 8 kilobytes (8000 bytes).  For comparison, a very low-quality video file normally requires several million bytes, and a 1080p movie requires about 3 gigabytes (3,000,000,000 bytes) per hour of playing time. , the plain text of the Dutch Wikipedia page describing the film Casablanca occupies 29,000 bytes.

Roel Pieper, former CTO and board member of Philips, is quoted as saying (translated from Dutch):

Pieter Spronck rebuts Pieper's codebook analogy by pointing out that Sloot claimed his invention was capable of encoding any video, not only those videos composed from a particular finite set of "recipes".

In 1996, Sloot received an investment from colleague Jos van Rossum, a cigarette machine operator. The same year, Sloot and van Rossum were granted a 6-year Dutch patent for the Sloot Encoding System, naming Sloot as inventor and van Rossum as patent owner.

Despite the apparent impossibility of the encoding system, there were investors who saw potential. In early 1999, Dutch investor Marcel Boekhoorn joined the group. In March 1999, the system was demonstrated to Pieper. Pieper resigned from Philips in May 1999 and joined Sloot's company as CEO, which was re-branded as The Fifth Force, Inc. The story — including an account of a demonstration in which Sloot apparently recorded and replayed a randomly selected 20-minute cooking program on a single smartcard — is told in modest detail in Tom Perkins' 2007 book Valley Boy: The Education of Tom Perkins.

Death of Sloot 
On July 11, 1999, Sloot was found dead, in his garden at his home in Nieuwegein, of an apparent heart attack. He died one day before the deal was to be signed with Pieper. The family consented to an autopsy, but none was performed.

Perkins, the co-founder of the Silicon Valley venture capital firm Kleiner Perkins, had agreed to invest in the technology when Sloot died. Perkins and Pieper would have proceeded after Sloot's death, but a key piece of the technology, a compiler stored on a floppy disk, had disappeared and, despite months of searching, was never recovered.

See also 
 Lost inventions

References

External links 
 Broadband applications on limited bandwidth networks (PDF) – see section 3.1.5, "Beyond the limits?"
 "Jan Sloot - The Source Code", Dutch-language website devoted to Jan Sloot and Sloot Coding System
 "The Source Code Part 1" "The Source Code Part 2" Dutch-Language News Segment Regarding Jan Sloot

Related Patents:
 NL1005930C: Sloot, Romke Jan Bernhard/J.V.R Services Nieuwegein BV: Compression of video data (02-11-1998)
 NL1009908: Sloot, Romke Jan Bernhard: Storage system for digital data relating to text or bit-map elements, involves storing possible values in coding memories and chopping incoming data into blocks for comparison with stored codes (22-02-2000)

Video compression
Lost inventions
Dutch inventions